Dave Chappelle: Killin' Them Softly is a 2000 American stand-up comedy television film directed by Stan Lathan and written by and starring comedian Dave Chappelle. Filmed at the Lincoln Theatre in Washington, D.C., it was Chappelle's first hour-long HBO special, premiering on HBO on July 26, 2000. In the special, Chappelle talks about a variety of topics, including racism, police brutality, and drug use.

Reception
Shortly after the special's release, Steve Johnson of the Chicago Tribune gave it a positive review, writing that it "[covers] the predictable black people versus white people and men versus women territory, but doing it with fresh observations and, more important, a sophisticated structure", and noting: "somebody give this guy a TV series".

In 2015, Dave Chappelle: Killin' Them Softly was ranked #6 on a Rolling Stone list of the 25 best stand-up specials and films, with writer Matthew Love stating that the special "delivers everything we know now as the comedian's trademarks: shaggy-dog tales with increasingly absurd details and quick reversals; loose-limbed and playful bits that even inspired the comedian to giggle fits; blistering commentary on race couched in seemingly offhanded storytelling. Weed-dealing three-year-olds and Sesame Street pimps aside, the comic's routines about police brutality are even more painfully prescient today than they were in 2000."

Home media
Dave Chappelle: Killin' Them Softly was released on DVD in 2003.

References

Further reading

External links
 
 

2000 films
2000 comedy films
HBO network specials
Stand-up comedy concert films
Films shot in Washington, D.C.
Films directed by Stan Lathan
Dave Chappelle